Michel Pintoin (c. 1350 – c. 1421), commonly known as the Monk of Saint-Denis or Religieux de Saint-Denis  was a French monk, cantor,  and chronicle writer best known for his history of the reign of Charles VI of France.  Anonymous for many centuries, in 1976 the Monk was tentatively identified as Michel Pintoin, although scholars continue to refer to him as the Monk or the Religieux.

The Monk of St Denis 
Michel Pintoin has been identified as a monk at the Basilica of St Denis, an abbey which had a reputation for writing chronicles. The monks at St Denis were considered the official chroniclers of the Valois kings and were given access to official documents.

Because he witnessed many of the events of the Hundred Years War, the Monk of St Denis is considered a valuable chronicler of this period. His history of the reign of Charles VI, titled Chronique de Religieux de Saint-Denys, contenant le regne de Charles VI de 1380 a 1422, encompasses the king's full reign in six volumes. Originally written in Latin, the work was translated to French in six volumes by L. Bellaguet between 1839 and 1852.

Pintoin, considered to be the most well-informed of the chroniclers in the court of Charles VI, wrote about events such as the English Peasants' Revolt in the 1380s and the Harelle and Maillotins revolts in France during the same period. He also recorded Charles VI's reinstatement of the Marmousets, the choice of Olivier de Clisson as royal constable, and the disastrous Bal des Ardents in 1393.

Style 

Because he was cleric, the Monk wrote about the Hundred Years War from a perspective that differed from secular or "chivalric" chroniclers such as Jean Froissart. Writing in Latin, his tone was frequently similar to a sermon. He sympathized with the commoners during the war and chastised the knights, who he believed behaved as poorly as common soldiers, to the point that they even caused harm. His opinion of knightly valour is summed up in this passage: Knights without courage, you who take pride in your armour plate and plumed helmets, you who glory in looting....you who boasted with so much arrogance about the feats of valour of your ancestors, now you have become the laughingstock of the English and the butt of foreign nations. Of the French defeat at the Battle of Agincourt, he wrote that it was caused by the arrogance of the French knights, who charged the English, with the result that "The nobility of France was captured and ransomed like a vile herd of slaves, or else it was slaughtered by an obscure soldiery".

Influence 

20th-century historians have determined that Pintoin was responsible for the vilification of Isabeau of Bavaria that has persisted since the time of his writing. A passage in his chronicle suggests she was the lover of her brother-in-law Louis I, Duke of Orléans, an allegation perpetuated in other chronicles and writing of the early 15th century. Historian Rachel Gibbons believes Pintoin's writing may have been pro-Burgundian propaganda; Tracy Adams writes that Pintoin's allegation of an incestuous union with the Duke of Orléans led her detractors not only to believe but to fabricate additional untruths about the queen.

References

Sources 
 Adams, Tracy. (2010) The Life and Afterlife of Isabeau of Bavaria. Baltimore: Johns Hopkins UP. 
 Curry, Anne. (2000). The Battle of Agincourt: Sources and Interpretations. Rochester, NY: Boydell Press. 
 Gibbons, Rachel. (1996) "Isabeau of Bavaria, Queen of France (1385-1422). The Creation of a Historical Villainess. Transactions of the Royal Historical Society, Volume 6, 51-73
 Le Bruesque, Georges. (2004). "Chronicling the Hundred Years War in Burgundy and France in the Fifteenth Century". in Writing War: Medieval Literary Responses to Warfare. ed. Corinne Saunders, et al. Cambridge: D.S Brewer. 
 Veenstra, Jan R.and Laurens Pignon. (1997).  Magic and Divination at the Courts of Burgundy and France. New York: Brill.

External links
 

French chroniclers
14th-century French writers
15th-century French writers
1350s births
1420s deaths
French male non-fiction writers